Stiles P. Jones (November 15, 1822 – September 15, 1861) was an American lawyer and politician.

Jones was born in Barkhamsted, Litchfield County, Connecticut. He moved to Minnesota in 1855 and settled in Rochester, Minnesota with his wife and family. Jones practiced law in Rochester, Minnesota. He served in the Minnesota Senate until his death in 1861.

References

1822 births
1861 deaths
People from Litchfield County, Connecticut
Politicians from Rochester, Minnesota
Minnesota lawyers
Minnesota state senators